Electrical measurements are the methods, devices and calculations used to measure electrical quantities. Measurement of electrical quantities may be done to measure electrical parameters of a system. Using transducers, physical properties such as temperature, pressure, flow, force, and many others can be converted into electrical signals, which can then be conveniently measured and recorded. High-precision laboratory measurements of electrical quantities are used in experiments to determine fundamental physical properties such as the charge of the electron or the speed of light, and in the definition of the units for electrical measurements, with precision in some cases on the order of a few parts per million. Less precise measurements are required every day in industrial practice. Electrical measurements are a branch of the science of metrology. 
 
Measurable independent and semi-independent electrical quantities comprise:
 Voltage
 Electric current 
 Electrical resistance and electrical conductance 
 Electrical reactance and susceptance
 Magnetic flux
 Electrical charge by the means of electrometer
 Partial discharge measurement
 Magnetic field by the means of Hall sensor
 Electric field
 Electrical power by the means of electricity meter
 S-matrix by the means of network analyzer (electrical)
 Electrical power spectrum by the means of spectrum analyzer

Measurable dependent electrical quantities comprise:
 Inductance 
 Capacitance 
 Electrical impedance defined as vector sum of electrical resistance and electrical reactance
 Electrical admittance, the reciprocal of electrical impedance
 Phase between current and voltage and related power factor
 Electrical spectral density
 Electrical phase noise
 Electrical amplitude noise
 Transconductance
 Transimpedance
 Electrical power gain
 Voltage gain
 Current gain
 Frequency
 Propagation delay

References 
 Electrical measurement safety manual (Microsoft PowerPoint file)
 Early electrical measurement equipment

Further reading
 Graeme Gooday The morals of measurement: accuracy, irony, and trust in late Victorian electrical practice , Cambridge University Press, 2004 

Electricity
Physical quantities